WQFL may refer to:

 WQFL (FM), a radio station (100.9 FM) licensed to Rockford, Illinois, United States
 WQFL-CA, a defunct low-power television station (channel 8) that was licensed to Rockford, Illinois, United States